Thomas Jefferson "College Boy" Johnson (April 22, 1889 – September 22, 1926) was an American pitcher in Negro league baseball, playing most of his career in the Pre-Negro league years.

Johnson played for several teams, but he played most of his career for the Chicago American Giants.

Nicknamed "College Boy" or "School Boy" Johnson, Tom Johnson attended Morris Brown College in the Atlanta, Georgia area.

By 1917, he was married with children.

Johnson died in Chicago at the age of 37, and was buried in the Lincoln Cemetery at Blue Island, IL.

References

External links
 and Baseball-Reference Black Baseball stats and Seamheads

1889 births
1926 deaths
Chicago American Giants players
Schenectady Mohawk Giants players
Lincoln Giants players
Louisville White Sox (1914-1915) players
Indianapolis ABCs players
Detroit Stars players
Baseball pitchers
Baseball players from Texas
People from Bryan, Texas
20th-century African-American people